The white-bellied crested flycatcher (Elminia albiventris) is a bird species in the family Stenostiridae; it was formerly placed with the drongos in the Dicruridae.

It is native to the Cameroon line (including Bioko) and the Albertine Rift montane forests.

References

white-bellied crested flycatcher
Birds of the Gulf of Guinea
Birds of Central Africa
white-bellied crested flycatcher
Taxonomy articles created by Polbot